Thesius may refer to:
 An alternative spelling for Theseus, the mythical founder-king of Athens
 Thesius (beetle), a beetle genus in the tribe Tropiphorini